Cantharidus lepidus is a species of sea snail, a marine gastropod mollusc in the family Trochidae, the top snails.

References

External links

Trochidae
Gastropods described in 1846